William Priestley may refer to:

William Priestley (St Mawes MP) (c.1594–1664), lawyer and member of the English House of Commons.
William Priestley (Louisiana planter)  (1771–1838), second son of Dr Joseph Priestley
William Priestley (wool clothier) (1779–1861), Halifax wool clothier, and founder of the Halifax Choral Society
Sir William Overend Priestley (1829–1900), gynaecologist and Conservative politician
Sir William Priestley (Liberal politician) (1859–1932), Liberal politician

See also
 William Priestly MacIntosh (1857-1930), Australian sculptor